is a Japanese footballer. He is a midfielder.

He was educated at and played for Kagoshima Technical High School.

As part of the football development program with JAPAN Soccer College, he played for Albirex Niigata FC (Singapore) from the S.League in 2013.

He was named as one of the players retained for the 2014 S.League season on December 3, 2013. He inherits the squad number 14 from the departed Masatake Sato, from his previous number 23, which is in turn taken up by club captain Shuhei Hotta.

He returned to Japan in 2016 to join his hometown club Kagoshima United FC and was assigned to its 2nd team.

Club career statistics
As of February 3, 2014

References

External links
 Kazuya Fukuzaki renews contract
 Player Profile on Albirex Niigata FC (S) Official Website

1994 births
Living people
Japanese footballers
Singapore Premier League players
Japan Soccer College players
Albirex Niigata Singapore FC players
Association football forwards
People from Kagoshima